The following article comprises the results of the Hockeyroos, the women's national field hockey team from Australia, from 2006 until 2010. New fixtures can be found on the International Hockey Federation's results portal.

Match results

2006 results

Argentina test series

Four Nations (Córdoba)

Canada test series

XVIII Commonwealth Games

Europe test matches

XIV FIH Champions Trophy

Four Nations (Baltimore + Virginia Beach)

South Africa test series

XI FIH World Cup

2007 results

XV FIH Champions Trophy

New Zealand test series

Japan test series

China test series

Good Luck Beijing

Oceania Cup

South Africa test series

Ireland test series

2008 results

Great Britain test series

XVI FIH Champions Trophy

Japan test series

XXIX Olympic Games

2009 results

South Africa test series

India test match

SPAR Cup

Germany test series

XVII FIH Champions Trophy

Oceania Cup

Spain test series

Argentina test series

2010 results

New Zealand test series

Korea test series

Argentina test series

Chile test match

FIH World Cup Qualifiers

Great Britain test series

Germany test series

Four Nations (Essen)

Ireland test series

XII FIH World Cup

XIX Commonwealth Games

References

Australia women's national field hockey team